The Battle of Bryn Derwin was fought in Eifionydd in Gwynedd in June 1255, between Llywelyn ap Gruffudd and his brothers, Dafydd ap Gruffudd and Owain Goch ap Gruffydd

Llywelyn had ruled over a truncated Kingdom of Gwynedd jointly with Owain since the death of the previous Prince of Wales, Dafydd ap Llywelyn, in 1246, but relations between the two men apparently deteriorated in the early 1250s. The battle lasted for no more than an hour, and resulted in a victory for Llywelyn; Dafydd and Owain were both imprisoned. Owain died in prison around 1282, but Dafydd was soon released and went on to play a central role in the royal government of Gwynedd until his defection and subsequent removal to England in the mid-1260s.

Subsequent military campaigns by Llywelyn in 1257 and 1260 recovered much lost Welsh territory, and his undisputed leadership within Wales ushered in a period of stability that would last until the mid-1270s.

See also 
 Llywelyn ap Gruffudd
 Dafydd ap Gruffudd
 Owain ap Gruffudd

Sources 
 J. B. Smith, Llywelyn ap Gruffudd: Prince of Wales (Cardiff, 1998).

Bryn Derwin
History of Gwynedd
Bryn Derwin
1255 in Wales